The Legal Services Board is an independent body responsible for overseeing the regulation of lawyers in England and Wales. It is a non-departmental public body sponsored by the Ministry of Justice, created through the Legal Services Act of 2007 (LSA2007).

The Legal Services Board is politically and financially independent of the government. Costs are covered entirely by a levy on the approved regulators of the legal professions. Its overriding mandate is to ensure that regulation in the legal services sector is carried out in the public interest and that the interests of consumers are placed at the heart of the system.

The Board came into being on 1 January 2009 and became fully operational on 1 January 2010.

Role and function
The Legal Services Board is an oversight regulator, and sits at the top of the regulatory system for legal services in England and Wales. It provides regulatory oversight of the eight ‘’approved regulators’’ named in the Legal Services Act of 2007 (LSA 2007), and two additional regulators added since the act gained Royal Assent.

The Act outlines the general functions of the Board, which include: a duty to promote the regulatory objectives (and act in a way which it considers most appropriate for the purpose of meeting those objectives); to assist the regulators in the maintenance and development of standards of regulation, education and training of authorised persons; to have regard to good corporate governance practice in its affairs; and to prepare an annual report detailing the discharge of its functions in the previous financial year and its performance in line with the regulatory objectives.

It also oversees the Office for Legal Complaints (the body responsible for administering the Legal Ombudsman scheme), and makes recommendations to amend the list of reserved legal activities.

Regulatory supervision
Regulation of the legal profession is the responsibility of the approved regulators (ARs). The LSB is responsible for overseeing the approved regulators and to ensure that regulation is conducted in adherence to the regulatory objectives, which it does through assessment against a regulatory performance framework. The LSB is responsible for ensuring that the approved regulators’ representative and regulatory functions are sufficiently independent from one another.

It does this by establishing Internal Governance Rules (IGR), which dictate how regulators’ independent regulatory arms are kept independent.

When regulators make changes to the rules governing those they regulate, they are required to submit an application to the LSB. The board then assesses these changes against a set of criteria on which applications can be refused, laid down in the Act.

The following list is a breakdown of the different legal professions, along with the approved regulator for that profession and its independent regulatory arm.

The approved regulators are:

The LSB has the power to recommend to the Lord Chancellor that they approve further approved regulators.  This means that new bodies can apply to the LSB to become front-line regulators of parts of the legal profession. As a result of the LSA 2007 coming into force, all changes to these bodies' internal professional regulatory arrangements must be approved by the LSB.[10]:s.20/ Sch.3, Pt.3

Under Section 51 to 54, the LSB has a duty to regulate practising fees, resolve regulatory conflicts and work with the Competition and Markets Authority and Lord Chancellor on competition issues.

Regulatory objectives
It has a duty to promote eight regulatory objectives defined under the Act, a duty it shares with the approved regulators:
 Protecting and promoting the public interest;
 Supporting the constitutional principle of the rule of law;
 Improving access to justice;
 Protecting and promoting the interests of consumers of legal services;
 Promoting competition in the provision of legal services;
 Encouraging an independent, strong, diverse and effective legal profession;
 Increasing public understanding of the citizens' legal rights and duties;
 Promoting and maintaining adherence to the professional principles.

The professional principles are:
 Authorized persons should act with independence and integrity;
 Authorized persons should maintain proper standards of work;
 Authorized persons should act in the best interests of their clients;
 Persons who exercise their rights before any court, a right of audience, or conduct litigation in relation to proceedings in any court by virtue of being authorized persons, should comply with their duty to the court to act with independence in the interests of justice;
 Affairs of clients should be kept confidential.

Powers and enforcement

If the approved regulators fail to uphold the regulatory objectives, or if they fail to comply with the 2007 Act, the LSB can:
 Under Sections 32 to 34: issue directions to the regulator to correct the deficiency;
 Under Sections 35 to 36: publish a public censure;
 Under Sections 37 to 40: impose a financial penalty;
 Under Sections 41 to 44: make an intervention direction whereby the regulatory function is performed by a person nominated by the Board; and
 Under Sections 45 to 48: recommend that Lord Chancellor cancel the regulator's approval.

Under Section 51 to 54, the LSB has a duty to regulate practising fees, resolve regulatory conflicts and work with the Competition and Markets Authority and Lord Chancellor on competition issues.

Relationship with the Ministry of Justice

The LSB a non-departmental government body, sponsored by the Ministry of Justice, but independent in its operations and decision making. Its staff are not civil servants, but public servants. The LSB receives no public funds, and is instead funded by a levy on the profession.

A framework document codifies the relationship between the two organisations.

Board and executive team

The Chair of the Board receives a non-pensionable remuneration of £63,000 per annum for 70 days work.

Board member positions carry a non-pensionable remuneration of £15,000 per annum for at least 30 days work.

Current

Dr Helen Phillips, Chair (lay-member, under the Act, the Chair is required to be a lay member).

The Lord Chancellor appointed Dr Helen Phillips as a lay-member of the board on 9 March 2015. She took over as interim Chair on 1 May 2017 after the previous post-holder, Sir Michael Pitt, decided not to seek a second term.

On 18 June 2018, following an open appointments process, the Lord Chancellor appointed Dr Phillips as a permanent Chair until 31 March 2023.

First term: March 2015 – March 2018.

Second term: April 2018 – March 2023

Matthew Hill, Chief Executive

Matthew joined the LSB in August 2018 as Chief Executive and as a member of its Board.

Catherine Brown (lay)

First term: 1 April 2019 to 31 March 2023

Second term: 1 April 2023 to 31 March 2027

Habib Motani (non-lay)

First term: 18 April 2022 to 17 April 2026

Jemima Coleman (non-lay)

First term: April 2016 to April 2019

Second term: 18 April 2019 to 17 April 2023

Stephen Gowland (non-lay)

First term: 1 August 2020 to 31 July 2024

Ian Hamer OBE (non-lay)

First term: 1 October 2019 to 30 September 2023

Second term: 1 October 2019 to 31 March 2023

Dr Gary Kildare (lay)

First term: 1 April 2021 to 31 March 2025

Flora Page (non-lay)

First term: 1 August 2020 – 31 July 2024

Catharine Seddon (lay member)

First term: 1 October 2016 - September 2019

Second term: 1 October 2019 to 30 September 2023

Previous Chairs

Sir Michael Pitt

First term: May 2014 - April 2017

David Edmonds

Second term: May 2011 - April 2014

First Term:  - April 2011

Legal Services Consumer Panel

On 11 November 2009, the LSB launched the Legal Services Consumer Panel. The Panel operates independently of the LSB and represents the interests of both individual and business consumers in the LSB’s work to oversee the regulation of lawyers. The establishment of the Panel was a statutory requirement of the Legal Services Act of 2007.
Members of the Panel are appointed by the LSB with the approval of Lord Chancellor.
The Panel examines issues of importance to legal services consumers, advises the LSB in its work overseeing the frontline regulators and publishes this advice. Should the LSB fail to agree with such advice, it is required to publish a written statement outlining its reasons.

Membership

The current Chair is Sarah Chambers, an expert in regulation, competition and consumer policy. The LSB announced her appointment on 17 April 2018.

The Panel’s inaugural Chair, Dr Dianne Hayter, was appointed in 2009. She did not take the position because of ongoing commitments in the House of Lords. She was succeeded in August 2011, by Elizabeth Davies.

After Davies stepped down at the end of 2016, the Legal Services Board appointed Dr Jane Martin to the post. Dr Martin stepped down in early 2018 to take up a role at the Office for Legal Complaints.

References

External links
 Official website

English law
Legal regulators of the United Kingdom